The 2013 Women's World Floorball Championships was the ninth World Championships in women's floorball. The tournament took place in Ostrava and Brno in Czech Republic in December 2013. Sixteen teams participated. Sweden won the tournament defeating Finland, 5-1, in the final-game.

Qualification

Venues

Preliminary round

Group A

Group B

Group C

Group D

Knockout stage

Playoff round

Quarterfinals

Semifinals

Bronze medal game

Gold medal game

Placement round

13th–16th place

9th–12th place

5th–8th place

15th place game

13th place game

11th place game

9th place game

7th place game

5th place game

Statistics

Tournament awards
 Tournament All-Star Team:
 Goalkeeper:  Jana Christianova
 Defenders:  Moa Tschöp,  Silvana Nötzli
 Forwards:  Emelie Lindström,  Sandra Mattsson,  Anna Wijk
 ASICS Golden Shoe MVP:  Sandra Mattsson

Final ranking

References

External links
Official site
IFF event site

2013, Women's
2013 in Czech women's sport
Sport in Brno
Sport in Ostrava
International floorball competitions hosted by the Czech Republic
2013 in floorball
December 2013 sports events in Europe